Repco is an Australian automotive engineering/retailer company. Its name is an abbreviation of Replacement Parts Company and was for many years known for reconditioning engines and for specialized manufacturing, for which they gained a high reputation. It is now best known as a retailer of spare parts and motor accessories.

The company gained fame for developing the engines that powered the Brabham Formula One cars in which Jack Brabham and Denny Hulme won the 1966 and 1967 World Championship of Drivers titles respectively. Brabham-Repco was awarded the International Cup for F1 Manufacturers in the same two years.

Repco currently runs a series of stores across Australia and New Zealand specialising in the sale of parts and aftermarket accessories.

The company was founded by Robert Geoffrey (Geoff) Russell in 1922 and first traded under the name Automotive Grinding Company, from premises in Collingwood, Victoria.

It currently has over 2,000 employees in almost 400 stores.

Repco was a publicly traded company being first listed on the Australian Stock Exchange in 1937, before being acquired by Pacific Dunlop in 1988. It was again listed in 2003; however, following acquisition of all shares by CCMP Capital Asia, Repco has been delisted from the Australian Stock Exchange. From 1 July 2013, Repco and the entire Exego group (consisting of Ashdown-Ingram, Mcleod Accessories and Motospecs) were all acquired by GPC Asia Pacific.

As at the end of 2013 Repco Australia had 295 Stores, and Repco New Zealand had 81 Repco Stores and an additional 10 Appco (Automotive Trade Only) Stores.

Repco V8 engine 
In 1964 the Australian/New Zealand Tasman Series was created with a 2500cc capacity limit applied to engines. Jack Brabham approached Repco to develop a suitable engine, and together they decided to base the SOHC design on Oldsmobile Jetfire 215 ci block with six cylinder-head studs per cylinder. Combined with a short stroke flat-plane crankshaft, Repco designed cylinder heads, camshafts and two-stage chain/gear cam drive, a 2.5L engine was built in 1965 with its cylinder head cast by Commonwealth Aircraft.

In 1963 the international motor racing body, the FIA, announced that the maximum engine capacity for the Formula One category would be doubled to three litres to start from the 1966 season. Despite calls for a "return to power" having been made, few teams were prepared as the main engine supplier in the UK, Coventry Climax, decided to get out of race engine building.

Jack Brabham used his friendship with engineer Phil Irving at Repco. He proposed they design and build a 3L version of the 2.5L engine by using a longer stroke flat-plane crankshaft.

The Repco board agreed to his proposal in light of the expected rival 2.75 L Coventry Climax FPF DOHC engine being of four-cylinder configuration deemed to be near-obsolete, and the plan to build the Cosworth DFV (revealed at the end of 1965 by Ford, its sponsor) was not known yet. A small team at Repco under Phil Irving developed the F1 engine, fitted with two valves per cylinder SOHC heads from the 2.5L version.

The first advantage of this Repco 620 V8 was its compact size and lightness, which allowed it to be bolted into an existing 1.5-litre Formula One chassis. Also unlike the others, it was reliable and due to low weight and power, the strain on chassis, suspension, brakes, and tyres was low.

This engine being based on British/American Rover V8 /Buick 215 block is a common misconception. The Oldsmobile version of this engine, although sharing the same basic architecture, had cylinder heads and angled valve covers designed by Oldsmobile engineers to look like a traditional Olds V8 and was produced on a separate assembly line. Oldsmobile's intention to produce a higher powered, turbo-charged Jetfire version led to significant differences from the Buick 215, primarily in cylinder head design: Buick used a 5-bolt pattern around each cylinder where Oldsmobile used a 6-bolt pattern. The sixth bolt was added to the intake manifold side of the head, one extra bolt for each cylinder, meant to alleviate a head-warping problem on high-compression versions. This meant that Buick heads would fit on Oldsmobile blocks, but not vice versa. Changing the compression ratio on an Oldsmobile 215 required changing the heads, but on a Buick 215, only the pistons, which was less expensive and simpler. GM's later use of parts diagrams drawn for Oldsmobile in Buick parts catalog showing a six-stud cylinder block sowed further confusion. Later Rover versions of the aluminum block and subsequent Buick iron small blocks went to a 4-bolt-per-cylinder pattern.

Four world titles for the single-camshaft 16-valve 
In 1966, the Repco engine was good enough to score three poles for Jack Brabham. In his one-off BT19, it helped him get four consecutive wins and both titles in the nine-races long season, a unique accomplishment for a driver and constructor. This was his third title.

The 2,995.58 cc V8 Repco had a bore and stroke of 3.50 x 2.375" (88.9 x 60.3 mm). In 1967, the bore and stroke remained unaltered. In that year,  bhp at 8,500 rpm was often quoted.

In 1967 the competition had made progress. Repco produced a new version of the engine, the 700 series, this time with a Repco designed block. Brabham scored two poles early in the year, but then the new Ford Cosworth DFV V8 appeared in the Lotus 49, setting a new pace with its  at 9,000 rpm, with Jim Clark and Graham Hill taking all poles in the rest of the season. As the Lotus was still fragile, the Brabham drivers scored two wins each. Brabham used new parts on his cars, which was not always helpful, so Denis Hulme collected more results and the title, followed by Brabham himself, who again won the constructors' title.

No success for the double-camshaft 32-valve 
The new Ford engine, which was made available to other teams in 1968 also, convinced Brabham that more power was needed. With hindsight Brabham commented that the single cam motor's reliability may have been enough to supplant the more powerful Cosworths as late as the 1968 season. A new version of the Repco V8, with gear driven double overhead camshafts and four valves per cylinder, was produced for 1968 to maintain its competitiveness. The season was a disaster as it proved very unreliable due to unsurmountable valve gear unreliability. There was also a 4.2-litre derivative for the Indy 500. Jochen Rindt, who had moved to Brabham at the wrong time, managed to score two poles and two podiums that year, while Brabham himself collected only two points. The Repco project had always been hindered by the lengthy lines of communication between the UK and Australia, which made correcting problems very difficult. Repco, having spent far more money than originally envisaged and having sold very few customer versions of its engine, stopped the project.

For 1969, the works Brabham team and most of the private Brabham entries also used the ubiquitous Cosworth powerplant. A pair of older Brabham-Repcos were entered in the season opening 1969 South African Grand Prix by local drivers Sam Tingle and Peter de Klerk, but no points were scored on the engine marque's last appearance in the world championship.

Also, LDS fitted with Repcos were used in the South African Grand Prix in the late 1960s, as well as in the national F1 series there.

Other racing 

Repco had been involved in Australian motor racing many years prior to the association with Brabham. Most famous had been development of the engine of the series of Maybach Specials in the 1950s to various wins including the 1954 New Zealand Grand Prix.

The Brabham-Repco project was initially aimed at the Tasman Series, where Coventry-Climax's obsolete FPF four-cylinder engine was dominant in the mid-1960s. The 2.5-litre version of the Repco V8 was never very successful in this series, initially producing no more power than the FPF. It did however record one Tasman Series round win with Jack Brabham driving his Repco powered Brabham BT23A to victory in the 1967 South Pacific Trophy at the Longford Circuit in Tasmania.

Brabham-Repco's were also prepared and entered in the 1968 and 1969 Indianapolis 500. In 1969, Peter Revson finished fifth in such a car. He also won a USAC race in the same year.

Further versions of the V8 engine were produced, including a 4.3-litre variant for sports car racing and a turbo-charged version intended for United States Automobile Club races. Neither version met with any international success, the turbo in particular being labelled 'Puff the Tragic Wagon' by its development team due to its lack of horsepower (compare with Puff the Magic Dragon).

The sports car engine (increased in size to 5.0 litres) was however dominant domestically, powering cars to several wins in the Australian Sports Car Championship and its predecessor the Australian Tourist Trophy, most notably powering the Matich sports cars built and raced by Frank Matich, and Elfin Sports Cars built and raced by Garrie Cooper.

Repco Brabham racing cars

When Jack Brabham began building racing cars in England he named his cars Repco Brabhams, the result of a sponsorship deal between Brabham and Repco. This name was applied regardless of the engine used, and the arrangement existed through to the end of the 1960s. The agreement saw Repco's international marketing of its automotive parts and service equipment supported by Brabham's racing achievements.

Repco-Holden Formula 5000 engine
Repco also developed and built the Repco-Holden Formula 5000 engine for Formula 5000 racing. Repco used the block and head castings of the Holden 308 V8 engine as its basis, but it featured many modifications including Lucas fuel injection, dual-coil Bosch ignition and more than 150 special components designed by Repco. The engine first tasted success in the 1970 Australian Grand Prix that was won by Frank Matich driving a Repco-Holden powered McLaren M10B.

The engine was then used extensively in racing vehicles including cars competing in the Tasman Series, the Australian Drivers' Championship, the Australian Sports Car Championship and the Australian Sports Sedan Championship.

Due to the success of the Repco-Holden V8, Holden enlisted Repco to carry out the development work (on the dyno only, according to Holden Dealer Team boss Harry Firth) on Holden's 308 engine for its Holden Torana SL/R 5000 that was released in 1974. Firth believed that developing the engine on the dyno and not on the race track saw continual problems for the engine such as oil surge - especially in touring car racing. He also claimed to have already cured the oil problems while developing the still-born Holden LJ Torana GTR XU-1 V8 in 1972 and that Holden ignored his warnings about the Repco engine.

The list of Repco-Holden's Formula 5000 engine race, championship and series wins includes:

Australian Grand Prix
 1970 - Frank Matich, McLaren M10B
 1971 - Frank Matich, Matich A50
 1976 - John Goss, Matich A53

Australian Drivers' Championship
 1972 - Frank Matich, Matich A50
 1973 - John McCormack, Elfin MR5
 1975 - John McCormack, Elfin MR6

New Zealand Grand Prix
 1973 - John McCormack, Elfin MR5
 1974 - John McCormack, Elfin MR5

Australian Sports Car Championship
 1975 - Garrie Cooper, Elfin MS7

Australian Sports Sedan Championship
 1980 - Tony Edmondson, Alfa Romeo Alfetta GTV

Australian Tourist Trophy
 1976 - Stuart Kostera, Elfin MS7

Toby Lee Series
 1974 - John McCormack, Chrysler Charger

International Cup for F1 Manufacturers – results 
 1966 Brabham-Repco – 1st
 1967 Brabham-Repco – 1st
 1968 Brabham-Repco – 8th
 1969 Brabham-Repco – NC

World Championship of Drivers – results

Complete Formula One World Championship results
(key) (results in bold indicate pole position) (results in italics indicate fastest lap)

References

External links

Repco New Zealand

Automotive companies of Australia
Australian racecar constructors
Auto parts suppliers of Australia
Automotive part retailers of New Zealand
Companies formerly listed on the Australian Securities Exchange
Formula One engine manufacturers
Retail companies of Australia
Retail companies established in 1922
Australian companies established in 1922
Companies based in Melbourne
Engine manufacturers of Australia
Automotive part retailers